Jungo Connectivity is an Israeli software company that specializes in driver monitoring system (DMS) software and device driver development.

History
Jungo Connectivity was founded in 2013 as an automotive software divestiture from Cisco Systems. Jungo Connectivity CEO and founder is Ophir Herbst. On July 28, 2021, Jungo completed an initial public offering on the Tel Aviv Stock Exchange, traded under the ticker JNGO.

References

External links
 

Software companies established in 1998
Software companies of Israel
Companies based in Netanya
1998 establishments in Israel